UNIFI was a trade union representing workers in the finance sector in Britain.  The name UNiFI was briefly adopted by the Barclays Group Staff Union in 1999.  Later in the year, the union merged with the Banking, Insurance and Finance Union and the NatWest Staff Association, and the new organisation chose the very similar name "UNIFI".  In 2004, UNIFI merged with Amicus, now part of Unite the Union.  The organisation's general secretary was Ed Sweeney, and the national secretary was Rob MacGregor.

General Secretaries
1999: Rory Murphy and Ed Sweeney

References 

Trade unions established in 1999
Trade unions disestablished in 2004
Finance sector trade unions
Defunct trade unions of the United Kingdom
1999 establishments in the United Kingdom
Trade unions based in London